Cats Pass, is situated in the Eastern Cape, Province of South Africa, on the road between Butterworth and Mazeppa Bay.

Mountain passes of the Eastern Cape